6/45 is a 2022 South Korean film directed by Park Gyu-tae, starring Go Kyung-pyo, Lee Yi-kyung, Eum Moon-suk, Park Se-wan and Kwak Dong-yeon. The film depicts a comical encounter between South and North Korean soldiers over the 5.7 billion won lottery that crossed the Military Demarcation Line on the wind. It was released on August 24, 2022.

Cast 
 Go Kyung-pyo as Sergeant Park Chun-woo
 A military police at the South Korean front guard post GP. He is the first owner of the lottery.
 Lee Yi-kyung as Junior Sergeant Ri Young-ho
 A NCO of the North Korean GP.
 Eum Moon-suk as Captain Kang Eun-pyo
 South Korean 437th Outpost commander.
 Park Se-wan as 2nd Lieutenant Ri Yeon-hee
 Young-ho's younger sister and a junior officer in the North Korean corps in charge of propaganda broadcasts to South Korea.
 Kwak Dong-yeon as Corporal Kim Man-cheol
 An observant belonging to the South Korean frontline
 Lee Soon-won as Senior Captain Choi Seung-il
 A North Korean political adviser
 Kim Min-ho as Senior Corporal Bang Cheol-jin
 A senior North Korean soldier specializing in hacking against South Korea.
 Yoon Byung-hee as Major Kim Gwang-cheol 
 Lee Jun-hyeok as Colonel, South Korean battalion commander
 Ryu Seung-soo
 Shin Won-ho as New recruit

Production 
Principal photography began on April 20, 2021 and concluded on June 26, 2021.

Accolades

References

External links
 
 
 

2020s South Korean films
2020s Korean-language films
2022 comedy films
South Korean comedy films
Films about lotteries
Films about North Korea–South Korea relations
Films about the Republic of Korea Armed Forces
Films about the Korean People's Army
Films about military personnel
Korean Demilitarized Zone in fiction
Military humor in film